Rush is the soundtrack to the film of the same name, released on September 10, 2013. The soundtrack features a musical score composed by Hans Zimmer, plus five classic rock songs by Dave Edmunds, Steve Winwood, Mud, Thin Lizzy, and David Bowie.

Track listing

Music appearing in the film and trailers and not included on the soundtrack

References

External links

2013 soundtrack albums
Hans Zimmer soundtracks
WaterTower Music soundtracks
Sony Classical Records soundtracks